Caleb Timu (born 22 February 1994) is a New Zealand-born Australian rugby footballer of Samoan heritage who played rugby union for the Queensland Reds in the Super Rugby competition.  His position of choice is back row/loose forward.

Early life
Timu was born in Auckland, New Zealand but his family migrated to Australia when he was four-years-old and he considers himself as an Australian.  Timu attended Marsden State High School and subsequently St Joseph's Nudgee College, where he was part of the Queensland team that won the Australian Schools Championship in 2011. He was selected for the Australian Schoolboys team that year.

Career

Rugby league
Timu began his rugby league career with the Goodna Eagles in the Ipswich competition. He started his professional career playing rugby league with the Brisbane Broncos in the Australian National Rugby League. He was named in the 2012 Holden Cup team of the year and represented the Queensland under-20s side in 2012 and 2013.

After serving for two years as a missionary for the Church of Jesus Christ of Latter-day Saints in New Zealand and the Cook Islands Timu returned to the Broncos. He played for the Souths Logan Magpies in the Queensland Cup and for the Broncos in the 2016 NRL Auckland Nines.

Rugby union
Timu signed with the Reds in 2016 and in the 2018 season was under the tutelage of former All Blacks and Kangaroos international Brad Thorn. Timu also won Player of the Year honours for his contributions to Bond University Queensland Country's winning the National Rugby Championship title in 2017.

Personal life
Timu is married to Pamera Paasi and the couple have two children. While playing rugby, Caleb is also currently a part-time student studying at Griffith University in Brisbane for a Bachelor of Business degree.

References

External links 
 

1994 births
Living people
Australia international rugby union players
Australian Mormon missionaries
Australian rugby union players
Australian rugby league players
Australian sportspeople of Samoan descent
New Zealand emigrants to Australia
Rugby league second-rows
Rugby league players from Auckland
Rugby union players from Auckland
Rugby union forwards
Souths Logan Magpies players